Lorin Sklamberg is a vocalist, accordionist, pianist, guitarist and founding member of American Klezmer band The Klezmatics. He began performing Jewish music at age fifteen, and moved to New York in the early 1980s to incorporate klezmer into his music.

Prior to New York, Lorin was part of the self-described "gay-Jewish-radical faerie folk duo" called Pilshaw and Sklamberg.

In addition to his work with The Klezmatics, Lorin works at the YIVO Institute for Jewish Research as their sound archivist.

Discography

With Don Byron
Don Byron Plays the Music of Mickey Katz (Nonesuch, 1993)

References

External links

Klezmatics members: Lorin Sklamberg

Klezmer musicians
Living people
Radical Faeries members
Year of birth missing (living people)
The Klezmatics members
American gay musicians
LGBT Jews
Musicians from California
American people of Jewish descent